Ham Yeong-jun (born 4 May 1997) is a South Korean footballer currently playing as a midfielder for Gifu.

Club statistics
.

Notes

References

External links

1997 births
Living people
South Korean footballers
South Korean expatriate footballers
Association football midfielders
J2 League players
J3 League players
Daejeon Hana Citizen FC players
FC Gifu players
South Korean expatriate sportspeople in Japan
Expatriate footballers in Japan